The XO Telescope is an astronomical  telescope located on the 3,054 m (10,000 foot) summit of Haleakala on Maui, Hawaii.  It consists of two 200-millimeter telephoto camera lenses, and resembles binoculars in shape.   It is used by the XO Project to detect extrasolar planets using the transit method. It is similar to the TrES survey telescope. The construction of the one-of-a-kind telescope cost $60,000 for the hardware, and much more than that for the associated software.

Planets discovered
The XO telescope has discovered six objects so far, five are hot Jupiter planets and one, XO-3b, may be a brown dwarf. All were discovered using the transit method.

Light green rows indicate that the planet orbits one of the stars in a binary star system.

See also
 List of extrasolar planets
A subset of XO light curves are available at the NASA Exoplanet Archive.

Other Ground-Based Transit Surveys
  Next-Generation Transit Survey
 Trans-Atlantic Exoplanet Survey or TrES
 HATNet Project or HAT
 Kilodegree Extremely Little Telescope or KELT
 SuperWASP or WASP

References

External links
 The XO Project website
 Astronomers Catch Planet By Unusual Means (SpaceDaily) May 19, 2006

Telescopes
Exoplanet search projects by small telescope